Breitenbush may refer to:

 Breitenbush River, a tributary of the Santiam River in the U.S. state of Oregon
 Breitenbush, Oregon, a community on the Breitenbush River
 Breitenbush Hot Springs Retreat & Conference Center, a retreat and conference center on the Breitenbush River
 Breitenbush Hot Springs (thermal mineral springs), the geological feature of thermal mineral springs system consisting of the upper and lower zones